Salix wolfi, or Wolf's willow, is a species of willow native to western United States, from north-central Montana and central Oregon to northern New Mexico.

Description 
It is a small, low-growing willow that grows about 40-100 cm (1-3 ft) tall. The leaves are about 1-5 cm long with either lanceolate or elliptic shape with long hairs on either side of the leaves. Twigs are pubescent with wavy hairs.

Distribution 
It is native to Oregon, Idaho, Montana, Wyoming, Nevada, Utah, Colorado and New Mexico.

Habitat 
Subalpine meadows, streams and ponds.

References 

wolfii